The 1994–95 Irish League Cup (known as the Wilkinson Sword League Cup for sponsorship reasons) was the ninth edition of Northern Ireland's secondary football knock-out cup competition. It concluded on 25 April 1995 with the final.

Linfield were the defending champions after lifting the cup for the third time with a 2–0 victory over Coleraine in the previous final. This season they went out in the second round to Cliftonville, who were the eventual runners-up after being defeated on penalties in the final by Ards. This is Ards' only League cup win to date.

First round

|}

Second round

|}

Quarter-finals

|}

Semi-finals

|}

Final

References

Lea
1994–95 domestic association football cups
1994–95